The fifteenth season of the American competitive reality television series Hell's Kitchen took place in October 2014 and premiered on January 15, 2016 on Fox. The prize was a head chef position at BLT Steak at Bally's Las Vegas. Country Club Chef Ariel Malone won the competition.

Gordon Ramsay and Marino Monferrato returned as head chef and Maître d' respectively. Season 10 winner Christina Wilson was the sous chef for the red team, although Andi Van Willigan-Cutspec, who got married, returned in episode 7 of this season when Hell's Kitchen hosted her wedding reception. Aaron Mitrano replaced James Avery as sous chef for the blue team. Wilson is the second former Hell's Kitchen winner to return as one of Ramsay's sous chefs, the first being season 2 winner, Heather West, who was the red kitchen's sous chef for season 6. Jason Thompson also returned as narrator for the first time since season 12.

This season holds two unique distinctions. It has neither a charity dinner service nor a Taste It, Now Make It challenge, both traditional staples of the latter half of the show. It is also the first season where every chef was nominated for elimination at least once. This season saw the return of normal single elimination before finals since season 6, instead of the tradition double elimination before finals. This season was also tied with season 7's record, with three times teams restructuring.

Chefs
Eighteen chefs competed in season 15.

Notes

Contestant progress

Episodes

Controversy
Following his exit at the end of episode 12, Frank, an active-duty Marine chef, stated his dislike for female chefs during his plea and claimed he never allowed any to work under him, saying, "The blue team never had any drama until the females came aboard and that's when the ship sunk. And that's exactly why I get fucking female Marines and I send them back wherever the fuck they came from." Following his comments, Marine public affairs representative Bryan Nygaard stated Frank's comments regarding female Marines "are not consistent with the Marine Corps' values of honor, courage and commitment," and he would "notify my chain of command as well as Sergeant Cala's chain of command to ensure that corrective action is being taken." Several days later, Frank was removed from his position with the Commandants' staff and transferred to the Enlisted Aide Program.

Ratings
The fifteenth-season premiere of Hell's Kitchen premiered to an audience of 3.43 million, 660,000 lower than last season's premiere, and down 10,000 from season 14's finale.

References

Hell's Kitchen (American TV series)
2016 American television seasons